Jacksonville High School (JHS) is an International Baccalaureate high school located in Jacksonville, North Carolina for students in grades 9–12.

Academics 
Jacksonville High School offers regular, honors, advanced placement, and International Baccalaureate program courses. The course of study usually follows a certain career path determined by the student, upon which they obtain a concentration.  Academics are based on an unweighted 4.0 scale and a class rank is also determined by these standards.

Athletics 
Jacksonville High School is in the 3A Coastal Conference with other area schools. There have been many accomplishments in every sport offered, i.e.: Men's soccer 2012 State Champions, and 2013 State Runners-Up. Home games are within the facilities on the campus.

Notable alumni 
 Ryan Adams, singer-songwriter, producer, and poet
 Jones Angell, play-by-play radio announcer
 David Braxton, former NFL linebacker
 Dave Dunaway, former NFL wide receiver
 Mike Frier, former NFL defensive end/defensive tackle
 Qasim Mitchell, former NFL offensive lineman
 Jamal Shuler, professional basketball player
 Benjy Taylor, college basketball coach
 Tyrone Willingham, retired college football head coach

References 

Educational institutions in the United States with year of establishment missing
Jacksonville, North Carolina
Public high schools in North Carolina
Schools in Onslow County, North Carolina